Eugene Franklin "Bubbles" Hargrave (July 15, 1892 – February 23, 1969) was an American catcher in Major League Baseball who played for the Chicago Cubs, Cincinnati Reds, and New York Yankees. He won the National League batting title in 1926 while playing for Cincinnati. He was nicknamed "Bubbles" because he stuttered when saying "B" sounds. Bubbles' younger brother, Pinky Hargrave, was also a major league catcher.

Biography
Hargrave was born in New Haven, Indiana. He started his professional baseball career in 1911 in the Central League and made his major league debut in 1913 with the Chicago Cubs. He was their backup catcher until 1915. From 1916 to 1920, he played mostly in the American Association. In 1920, he had a big season with the St. Paul Saints, batting .335 with 22 home runs and finishing second in the league batting race. St. Paul won the pennant.

Hargrave was then acquired by the Cincinnati Reds. He was their starting catcher for most of the 1920s and consistently put up good hitting numbers. In 1926, he won the National League batting title with a .353 average. The rules at the time required batting champions to play in at least 100 games, and Hargrave pinch hit several times to get to 105. He was the first catcher to lead the NL in batting average. In 1927, he led the league's catchers in fielding percentage.

Hargrave went back to St. Paul for the 1929 season. He managed the club to a second-place finish and also made the league All-Star team. He batted .369 in 104 games. The following year, Hargrave served as a backup catcher for the New York Yankees. He then went back to the minors for a few seasons before retiring in 1934.

After his baseball days, Hargrave worked for a valve company. He died at age 76 in Cincinnati, Ohio. He was inducted into the Cincinnati Reds Hall of Fame in 1962 and the Indiana Baseball Hall of Fame in 2005.

See also
List of Major League Baseball batting champions
Cincinnati Reds award winners and league leaders

References

External links

1892 births
1969 deaths
Major League Baseball catchers
National League batting champions
Cincinnati Reds players
Chicago Cubs players
New York Yankees players
Terre Haute Terre-iers players
Kansas City Blues (baseball) players
St. Paul Saints (AA) managers
St. Paul Saints (AA) players
Minneapolis Millers (baseball) players
Minor league baseball managers
Baseball players from Indiana
People from New Haven, Indiana